Ginosigma is a genus of Thelyphonid whip scorpions, first described by E. A. M. Speijer in 1936.

Species 
, the World Uropygi Catalog accepts the following two species:

 Ginosigma lombokensis Speijer, 1936 – Indonesia
 Ginosigma schimkewitschii (Tarnani, 1894) – Cambodia, Laos, Malaysia, Singapore, Thailand, Vietnam

References 

Arachnid genera
Uropygi